Holder is a surname.

Notable people with the surname include:

Politics and government
 Eric H. Holder, Jr. (born 1951), United States Attorney General from 2009 to 2015
 Frederick Holder (1850–1909), South Australia politician
 Janice M. Holder (born 1949), American jurist
 Trevor Holder (born 1973), Canadian politician

Military and naval
 Burton Allen Holder (1843–1920), Chickasaw Indian, Confederate officer in the American Civil War
 Randolph M. Holder (1918–1942), American naval aviator

Entertainment
 Albrecht Holder, (born 1958), a German classical bassoonist
 Boscoe Holder (1921–2007), Trinidadian dancer, choreographer and painter
 Christian Holder (born 1949), British-Trinidadian dancer and choreographer
 Geoffrey Holder (1930–2014), Trinidadian-American character actor, choreographer and dancer
 Joseph William Holder (1764–1832), English composer
 Meagan Holder, American actress
 Noddy Holder (born 1946), English musician and actor
 Roy Holder (1946–2021), English television actor

Academics and literature
 Alfred Holder (1840–1916), Austrian-German classicist
 Colleen Holder, Trinidad and Tobago news presenter and producer
Michelle Holder, American economist
 Nancy Holder, American writer
 William Holder (1616–1698), English music theorist

Religion
 Christopher Holder (born c. 1631), Anglo-American Quaker minister

Science and technology
 Charles Frederick Holder (1851–1915), American naturalist, science writer, and sport fisherman
 Joseph Bassett Holder (1824–1888), American zoologist and physician
 Livingston L. Holder, Jr., an executive with a private spaceflight company
 Otto Hölder (1859–1937), German mathematician

Sport
 Adzil Holder (born 1931), Barbadian cricketer
 Alijah Holder (born 1996), American football player
 Bob Holder (born 1931), Australian rodeo competitor
 Chemar Holder (born 1998), Barbadian cricket player
 Edward Holder (1908–1974), All Black
 Jason Holder (born 1991), Barbadian and West Indies cricket player
 John Holder (cricketer) (born 1945), cricketer and umpire
 Kyle Holder (born 1994), American professional baseball player
 Phil Holder (born 1952), English football manager and coach
 Rieah Holder (born 1993), Barbadian netball player
 Roland Holder (born 1967), West Indian cricketer
 Tra Holder (born 1995), Thai-American Basketball player
 Vanburn Holder (born 1945), West Indian cricketer
 Will Holder (American football) (born 1975), American Arena Football League player

Fictional people
 Alexander Holder, a character in The Adventure of the Beryl Coronet, a Sherlock Holmes story by Arthur Conan Doyle
 Stephen Holder, a character on the American crime drama television series The Killing

English-language surnames